The Threshold are a fictional organisation who appeared in the Doctor Who Magazine comic strip based on the long-running British science fiction television series Doctor Who.

The Threshold were created by the "partnership" of Abraham White, a travelling salesman, and the Pariah, a living weapon of great power created on Gallifrey many years ago, but was soon cast out by Rassilon as it had developed a mind of its own and rebelled. During a final battle with Rassilon, its containment sphere crashed to Earth, where it was discovered by Abraham. Offering him power and immortality, the Pariah persuaded Abraham to merge with her core being. After helping Henry Ford begin the mass production line of his cars, an inspired Abraham mass-produced a series of spheres, giving birth to the Threshold.

The Threshold began their careers as profiteers, using their transport window capabilities to carry out important missions from their clients, during the DMW comic strip "Ground Zero" (Issues 238–242) they eventually come under contract to the Lobri, a race of spider-like parasitic entities trapped on a plane of reality that also holds together the link between human minds. They supply the Lobri with the resources required to instigate a breakout, a large gathering of humans at the Notting Hill Carnival, and supply them with three of the Doctor's previous companions, Peri, Ace, and Sarah Jane Smith, to gain enough power to escape the dimension, having taken them from previous adventures in the Doctor's life.

The Doctor, along with his granddaughter Susan, were also abducted and used by Threshold agents, but successfully managed to trick the main Threshold operative for the Notting Hill mission, Isaac, and travelled to the realm. There, they saved all of the companions, except for Ace, who dies saving the Doctor. They destroyed two of the Lobri, and killed the surviving member when it arrived on Earth. Using the TARDIS, the Threshold remained untouched, and with their secrets still known only to them, merely continued on with business as usual. Their only real weakness is their inability to time travel, providing the Doctor with an inevitable upper hand when dealing with them in later adventures.

During the Eighth Doctor comic strip adventure "Fire and Brimstone" (Issues 251–255), the Threshold are hired by the Time Lords to eliminate the Daleks as they attempt to open the doorway to an alternate reality as part of a war effort to destroy a group of alternate Daleks that had crossed over into their reality, and then to eventually conquer all of the multiverse. This goal was not above attempting to sacrifice the Doctor, their major interest in fulfilling this contract was the reward: A black box (which would allow them the gift of universal translation, necessary to implement a message to the galaxies on a proposal of their own).

The Doctor successfully managed to end the Dalek threat without sacrificing himself, and the Threshold attained their box. Tiring of the Threshold's manipulations, the Doctor fought back in the comic strip "Wormwood" (Issues 266–271). Enabling the aid of a disguised Shayde to fake his own regeneration, he allowed the Threshold to believe him vulnerable enough to take the TARDIS crew to their main base on the moon, a western like town on the surface (to appease Abraham's roots) and a major complex underneath. The Doctor's friends learned of the Threshold's secret history and the extent of their agenda; to make universal travel impossible and profit from the continuous use of their interdimensional windows.

With the plot revealed, the Doctor came out of hiding, the Pariah then revealed that it had tricked even its own creations, it (or a "she" by her own admission) wiped out the Threshold legions by shifting their Eye of Disharmony device, using it to disrupt their universe, a split second in time, killing them instantly. Abraham at this point turned against the Pariah and separated himself from her, causing her to lose most of her powers, before finally being brought down by Shayde, who is revealed to be her successor. The Doctor destroys the Eye's control centre, and the device explodes, decimating the alien moon and killing both White and The Pariah, ending the Threshold's organisation once and for all.

Doctor Who organisations